Abel Smith may refer to:
 Abel Smith (1717–1788), banker and MP for Aldborough, St Ives and St Germans (1774–1788)
 Abel Smith (1748–1779), MP for Nottingham (1778–1779)
 Abel Smith (1788–1859), MP for Malmesbury, Wendover, Midhurst and Hertfordshire (1810–1847)
 John Abel Smith (1802–1871), MP for Midhurst and Chichester (1830–1859 and 1863–1868)
 Abel Smith (1829–1898), MP for Hertfordshire and Hertford (intermittently 1854–1898)
 Abel Henry Smith (1862–1930), MP for Christchurch (1892–1900) and Hertford (1900-1910)

People with the surname
 Sir Alexander Abel Smith (1904–1980), British Army officer and merchant banker
 Brian Abel-Smith (1926–1996) British economist and welfare reformer
 Edward Abel Smith, nephew of Richard Branson and third husband of Kate Winslet
 Henriette, Lady Abel Smith (1914–2005), lady-in-waiting to Queen Elizabeth II, wife of Sir Alexander Abel Smith
 Sir Henry Abel Smith (1900–1993), Governor of Queensland
 Lady May Abel Smith, (1906–1994), born Princess May of Teck, wife of Sir Henry Abel Smith

Smith, Abel